AFL North West is an Australian rules football competition in the Tamworth and New England region of New South Wales, Australia.  The league began as a "pub competition" in Tamworth in 1997, with four 12-a-side teams, but has since grown to a regional league with six teams based in six towns.

Previously known as the Tamworth Australian Football League , the name was changed for the 2017 season.

Prior to the establishment of the Tamworth AFL, there had been two other leagues in the area, the New England AFL, which folded after the 1984 season - and the North West AFL, which folded after the 1993 season.

Clubs

Current

Previous

Premiers

   *(match abandoned at end 3rd quarter)

2010 Ladder

2011 Ladder

2012 Ladder

2013 Ladder

2014 Ladder

2015 Ladder

2016 Ladder

2017 Ladder

2018 Ladder

2019 Ladder

See also
AFL NSW/ACT
Australian rules football in New South Wales
Group 4 Rugby League
Group 19 Rugby League

External links
 

Australian rules football competitions in New South Wales
Tamworth, New South Wales